The State vs. Radric Davis is the sixth studio album by American rapper Gucci Mane. It was released on December 8, 2009. The State vs. Radric Davis came after a slew of independent releases, mixtapes, and features over the prior few years. Productions from Polow da Don, Drumma Boy, Fatboi, Mannie Fresh, among others. Featured artists include Usher, Plies, Lil Wayne, Cam'ron, Soulja Boy, Rick Ross, Bun B, OJ da Juiceman, Wooh da Kid, Waka Flocka Flame, and Nicki Minaj. The iTunes deluxe version contains the EP, Wasted: The Prequel.

The album was met with generally favorable reviews from music critics. It debuted at number 10 on the US Billboard 200, selling 90,000 copies in its first week, and was certified gold by the RIAA for sales exceeding 500,000 copies.

Background
Based on the success of The State vs. Radric Davis, Gucci Mane announced that his next two albums would be part of a trilogy, with the two of them titled The Appeal: Georgia's Most Wanted and The State vs. Radric Davis: The Verdict due to be released on September 28, 2010. However, he later decided to break the trilogy and change the third album's title.

Singles
"Wasted", featuring Plies, was released as the album's lead single on July 7, 2009. The song peaked at number 36 on the US Billboard Hot 100, and number 3 on the Hot R&B/Hip-Hop Songs chart, making it as his first top five on the chart.

"Spotlight", featuring Usher, was released as the album's second single on October 19, 2009. The song peaked at number 42 on the US Billboard Hot 100, and number 15 on the Hot R&B/Hip-Hop Songs chart.

"Lemonade" was released as the album's third single on December 7, 2009. The song peaked at number 53 on the US Billboard Hot 100, number 15 on the Hot R&B/Hip-Hop songs chart, and number 8 on the Top Rap Songs chart. The song's subject matter involves the proceeds from the illegal sale of codeine-infused lemonade, all of which the artist describes as yellow or lemon-colored.

"Bingo", featuring Soulja Boy and Waka Flocka Flame, was released as the album's fourth single on January 12, 2010. The song peaked at number 75 on the US Hot R&B/Hip-Hop chart.

Promotional singles
"Worst Enemy" was released as the album's first promotional single on November 12, 2009. The song revisits Gucci Mane's past about how it led to his fame and how he's moving on in life despite his struggles. Young Jeezy and T.I. are referenced on this song. The music video for the song was released on December 8, 2009.

"Heavy" was released as the album's second promotional single on November 25, 2009.

Other songs
The videos for the deluxe edition tracks "Bricks" (featuring Yung Ralph and Yo Gotti), "Photoshoot", and "She Got a Friend" (featuring Juelz Santana and Big Boi) were released on iTunes on October 20, 2011. A music video was also filmed for "All About the Money", featuring Rick Ross. "Bricks" and "Photoshoot" managed to peak at number 19 and 18 on the US Billboard Bubbling Under R&B/Hip-Hop Singles chart, respectively. "I'm a Dog" (featuring DG Yola) and "Sex in Crazy Places" (featuring Bobby V, Nicki Minaj, and Trina) debuted on the same chart at number 8 and number 22, respectively, due to digital sales.

Critical reception

The State vs. Radric Davis received generally favorable reviews from music critics. At Metacritic, which assigns a normalized rating out of 100 to reviews from mainstream critics, the album received an average score of 66, based on 11 reviews.

Joshua Errett of NOW gave the album high praise for its "loveable simplicity" on the typical hip-hop clichés and said that its cast of guest artists and producers combined with Gucci's performance would turn the record into "rap's album of the year." Gregory Heaney of AllMusic praised the producers and guest artists for creating an album that's a culmination of the Dirty South sound and Gucci for straddling the line between excessive and contemplative, saying that, "At the end of the day, The State vs. Radric Davis delivers the full spectrum of Gucci Mane, showing both the cash and yellow diamond-loving side, as well as his more reflective (or at least more self-aware) side." Rob Markman of XXL also credited the album for having the producers supply it with great sounds and for giving Gucci some guests artists he can trade lines with, concluding that "musically, The State vs. Radric Davis has proven the rapper's case beyond a reasonable doubt. So when rap fans ask if he is now a bankable hip-hop star, let the record show that Gucci mane is guilty as charged." Spin writer Sean Fennessey was fascinated by Gucci's "low-toned voice, relentless repetition, and brilliantly goofy way with vocabulary" in his lyrical delivery and how subversive he can be on tracks like "Heavy" and "Worst Enemy", concluding that, "Gucci is not always so reflective; sometimes he's as broad and bracing as a ball-peen hammer [...] But more often than not, the prolific MC limits his id, and emphasizes a surprisingly gripping superego."

Louis Cloutier of RapReviews commended the contributions from Fatboi and Drumma Boy throughout the record but was critical of Gucci's limited skills as a rapper, pointing out he excels in the "light-hearted goofiness" of the former but gets overshadowed by the guest artists who ride the latter's "dark and serious tone" better than he does, with the exception of "Worst Enemy", concluding that "In short, there's nothing seriously wrong with Gucci Mane, but there's nothing seriously right either." Michaelangelo Matos of The A.V. Club credited Gucci for compensating his rap delivery over "tinny keyboards and booming drum machines" with "sharp wordplay" but found that formula for the album lacking and suggested listening to his free mixtapes. Paul MacInnes of The Guardian found the album disappointing, calling the Dirty South sound "by the numbers", the producers' contributions unengaging and Gucci's mumbling delivery hard to listen to. Rob Boffard of NME criticized Gucci's flow and lyricism for being monotonous and irritating and the producers and guest artists for not offering anything worthy to the album, concluding that "'…Radric Davis is deeply flawed, and ultimately Gucci has committed the worst crime in rap: he’s boring."

Track listing

Sample credits
"Lemonade" contains a sample of "Keep It Warm" performed by Flo & Eddie
"Kush Is My Cologne" contains a sample of "I Got Em" performed by Drumma Boy, Gucci Mane and J Money

Interpolate credits
"Kush Is My Cologne" contains an interpolation of "Rehab" performed by Amy Winehouse

Charts

Weekly charts

Year-end charts

Certifications

See also
 List of number-one rap albums of 2009 (U.S.)
 List of number-one rap albums of 2010 (U.S.)

References

2009 albums
Gucci Mane albums
Asylum Records albums
Albums produced by Bangladesh (record producer)
Albums produced by Drumma Boy
Albums produced by Fatboi
Albums produced by J.U.S.T.I.C.E. League
Albums produced by Jazze Pha
Albums produced by Mannie Fresh
Albums produced by Polow da Don
Albums produced by Shawty Redd
Albums produced by Scott Storch
Albums produced by Zaytoven
Warner Records albums